Sir Henry Norris (1554–1599) was an English soldier and politician during the Tudor period.

Early life
The fourth son of Henry Norris, 1st Baron Norreys, he matriculated at Magdalen College, Oxford, in 1571, and was created M.A. in 1588. 
He grew up at Rycote in Oxfordshire and Wytham in Berkshire (now Oxfordshire).

Military career
He was captain of a company of English volunteers at Antwerp in June 1583, and while serving with his brothers John and Edward in the Low Countries in 1586 was knighted by Robert Dudley, 1st Earl of Leicester, after the battle of Zutphen (September). He was sent to Brittany in May 1592 to report on the condition of the English forces, and in December 1593 was captain of a regiment of nine hundred Englishmen there.

He was member of parliament for Berkshire in 1588–89 and 1597–1598, but spent his latest years with his brothers John and Thomas in Ireland. In 1595 he was colonel-general of infantry. Taking part under Robert Devereux, 2nd Earl of Essex, in the campaign in Munster in June 1599, he was wounded in the leg in an engagement with the Irish at Finniterstown. He bore amputation with patience, but died a few weeks later.

References

Attribution

1554 births
1599 deaths
Members of the Parliament of England for Berkshire
Alumni of Magdalen College, Oxford
People from Thame
People from Vale of White Horse (district)
16th-century English soldiers
People of Elizabethan Ireland
Henry, colonel-general
English MPs 1589
English MPs 1597–1598
Younger sons of barons